
Year 726 (DCCXXVI) was a common year starting on Tuesday (link will display the full calendar) of the Julian calendar. The denomination 726 for this year has been used since the early medieval period, when the Anno Domini calendar era became the prevalent method in Europe for naming years.

Events 
 By place 

 Byzantine Empire 
 Emperor Leo III issues a series of edicts banning the veneration of images (726–729), and launching the iconoclastic controversies. Most of the clergy – particularly in Italy and Greece – are opposed to these edicts with uncompromising hostility, and in the western parts of the Byzantine Empire the people refuse to obey his religious reforms.  
 Arab–Byzantine War: Muslim forces under Maslama ibn Abd al-Malik resume their expedition against Anatolia (modern Turkey). In a large-scale raid they plunder the fortress city of Caesarea.

 Europe 
 Umayyad conquest of Gaul: Muslim raiders under Abdul Rahman al-Ghafiqi, current governor of Septimania, devastate Avignon, Viviers, Valence, Vienne and Lyon (approximate date).
 Marcello Tegalliano dies after a 9-year reign. Uprising in Venice against Byzantium. The cause of mass unrest was the iconoclastic decrees of Emperor Leo III. A few days later, political demands were put forward for wide autonomy within the Byzantine Empire and the right to appoint the ruler of the region - Doge. The rebels elect Orso Ipato the Doge of Venice. Desiring to preserve the proceeds of the treasury from the second most important port of the Byzantine Empire and not having the resources to cope with a well-fortified and armed region, Byzantium agrees with all the requirements put forward. Orso Ipato recognised by Leo III, who gives him the title hypatos. The Venetian fleet, led by Orso Ipato, frees Ravenna from the Lombards and restores the power of the Byzantine governor there.
 Seismic activity in the Mediterranean Sea: The volcanic island of Thera erupts, while the city of Jerash (in present-day Jordan) suffers a major earthquake.

 Britain 
 King Ine of Wessex resigns his crown, and travels on a pilgrimage to Rome. He is succeeded by his brother-in-law (and probably distant cousin) Æthelheard.
 Dúngal mac Selbaig is deposed as king of Dál Riata (Scotland). He is succeeded by Eochaid mac Echdach (a son of former king Eochaid mac Domangairt).

 Asia 
 The first annual Sumo tournament in Japan is held by Emperor Shōmu (approximate date).

 Central America 
October 22 – Itzamnaaj K'awiil, the ruler of the Mayan city state at Dos Pilas in Guatemala since 698, dies after a 28-year reign.

 By topic 

 Religion 
 Abbo of Provence, Frankish nobleman, founds Novalesa Abbey in Piedmont (Northern Italy). 
 Benedictine abbey of Neuwiller founded by bishop Sigibald of Metz.
 Council of Manzikert in Armenian and West Syriac churches

Births 
 Grifo, Frankish duke and son of Charles Martel (d. 753)
 Paulinus II, patriarch of Aquileia (approximate date)

Deaths 
 October 22 – Itzamnaaj K'awiil, a Maya ruler of Dos Pilas
 Anbasa ibn Suhaym al-Kalbi, Muslim governor
 Marcello Tegalliano, doge of Venice
 Oda of Scotland, Christian saint (approximate date)
 Smbat VI, Armenian prince
 Tobias, bishop of Rochester

References